Cape Caution is a headland along the Central Coast of the Canadian Province of British Columbia. It is the point where Queen Charlotte Strait meets Queen Charlotte Sound, as well as where Mount Waddington Regional District meets Central Coast Regional District.

Toponymy
Cape Caution was named by British maritime explorer George Vancouver in May 1793 for the turbulent waters and rocky coastline found in the vicinity. Vancouver had nearly lost his ship, HMS Discovery, the previous year on a rock about 24 kilometres southeast of the headland.

Geography
Cape Caution is located on the western end of a large unnamed peninsula. It is bound to the northwest by Blunden Bay and to the southeast by Silvester Bay. Despite the visual prominence of the cape, the true westernmost point of the unnamed peninsula is Neck Ness.

Conservation
The unique ecology of the headland is protected within the  Ugʷiwa’/Cape Caution Conservancy and the  Ugʷiwa’/Cape Caution–Blunden Bay Conservancy.

See also
Cape Scott Lighthouse

References

Central Coast of British Columbia
Headlands of British Columbia